Caleufú is a town in Rancul Department of La Pampa Province in Argentina.

References

Populated places in La Pampa Province